The Glassware and Ceramic Museum of Iran (Muze-ye Abgineh va Sofalineh-ye Irān) or simply Abgineh Museum (Muze-ye Abgineh) is located at 30 Tir Street (formerly known as Ghavam Al Saltaneh Street), in Tehran, Iran. It was private residence of longtime Prime Minister Ahmad Qavam from 1921 until 1951. The complex was also Embassy of Egypt for seven years.

Gallery

See also
Ahmad Qavam
National Museum of Iran
Museum of the Islamic Era
Hans Hollein

References

External links

Museums in Iran
Museums established in 1976
Museums in Tehran
Buildings and structures completed in 1931
Architecture in Iran
Ceramics museums